There are several venues of competition for policy debate in the United States.

High School Tournaments
Most high school debaters debate in local tournaments in their city, state or nearby states. Hundreds of such tournaments are held at high schools throughout the US each weekend during the debate season.

Structure
Tournaments at the high school level often include individual, or speech events, in addition to debate. Many debaters choose to compete in both speech and debate events. These events vary based on the tournament and its sponsoring agency. A typical tournament is spread over two days, and usually occurs on the weekend (Friday-Saturday)

Day one is usually reserved for speech events and preliminary debate rounds. The number of preliminary rounds varies from tournament to tournament, ranging from only three rounds up to eight at the largest of tournaments. The preliminaries of speech are often concluded during this time. In some cases the events alternate with one round of speech, then one round of debate and so on. Day two is usually reserved with the "out-rounds" of the tournament, in which those that qualified (based on pre-elimination records) will compete in elimination rounds.

Breaking into Out-Rounds

Also known as "clearing", debaters are scored based upon win–loss record, speaking ability, and the win–loss record of the teams they opposed. To first decide who qualifies, win–loss record is used, then moving down the list to break ties. The winners are seeded into a bracket that is either "power-protected" or "power-matched". For example, in a power-protect tournament, the highest seed will debate the lowest seed, and in a power-matched tournament, the high seed will debate the high seed. At most tournaments the out-rounds will start at the octo-final level, although at large tournaments out-rounds may begin at the double or even triple octo-final level and some very small local tournaments could break to Quarterfinals, or in extremely small tournaments Semifinals. These rounds are commonly adjudicated with a panel of three or more judges. The siding of the debate is often based on a coin flip, unless the two opposing teams had debated one another earlier in the tournament.

Sweepstakes
Each school will fill an entry with speakers and debaters to qualify for the sweepstakes award, in which the collective achievements of the teams are compared to decide which school will win that tournament. Points are awarded for debaters and speakers who break into out-rounds, with the higher points awarded for finalists. During the tabulation of the tournament, a winner is decided and awarded during the Awards Ceremony at the conclusion of the tournament.

National Circuit
A small subset of high school debaters, mostly from elite public and private schools, travel around the country to tournaments in what is called the 'national circuit.'  Major national circuit tournaments include the Glenbrooks at Glenbrook North and Glenbrook South High Schools in the North Shore area of Chicago, the Barkley Forum for High Schools at Emory University, the Greenhill Fall Classic at Greenhill in Texas, the Berkeley Invitational at Berkeley in Northern California, and the St. Mark's Heart of Texas Invitational at St. Mark's School of Texas in Dallas, however there are seven major tournaments and about forty smaller national circuit tournaments. Colleges and university with policy debate programs at the collegiate level also often host tournaments for this circuit. Another elite form is the TOC (Tournament of Champions), in which qualification is required by winning bids from at least two large-scale, participating tournaments by advancing to a certain stage depending on the size of the tournament.  About 70 teams of two from around the country qualify for the TOC every year.

High School Championship
The high school debate tournament generally considered to be the national circuit championship is the Tournament of Champions held at the University of Kentucky.
For non-national circuit debaters the national championship is generally considered to be the national tournament of their sponsoring organization, either 
 the National Urban Debate Championship Tournament of the National Association of Urban Debate Leagues
the National Speech and Debate Tournament of the National Forensic League  or
the Grand National Tournament of the National Catholic Forensic League or the NCFCA.
The largest high school debate tournament by entry is the Glenbrooks.
Students in urban debate programs participate in tournaments sponsored by local urban debate leagues or by the National Association of Urban Debate Leagues, which annually hosts a national championship in Chicago.
The National Debate Coaches' Association hosts an annual tournament at the end of the year, with a qualification process based on points achieved at various tournaments. This tournament is generally viewed as a precursor national tournament to the TOC, because the same teams generally qualify to both tournaments.

College Tournaments
Inter-Collegiate policy debate has a scheduled list of tournaments through the season at both a regional and national scale. The season spans from September to the end of March and at times into the beginning of April. Colleges and universities host tournaments most weekends during this span of time.

Structure
Tournaments are hosted over a three-day period of time, in most instances. This can either be Friday-Sunday, or more often Saturday-Monday. The number of rounds per tournament ranges from 6-8 usually, although small regional tournaments may have fewer. The first two days of competition are when the preliminary rounds occur, possibly beginning the first out-round the second night. The final day of competition is reserved for out-rounds.

Breaking into Out-Rounds
The same system is used for determining who participates in elimination rounds at the college level, as at the high school level. It is common for tournaments to break to double octa-finals. The deliberation time for the judges in these elimination rounds is often lengthy, hence the need for a full day for the elimination rounds to be completed.

College National Championships
There is no single unified national championship in college debate; the National Debate Tournament (NDT), the Cross Examination Debate Association (CEDA) and the American Debate Association (ADA) all host national tournaments. There are also Junior Varsity and Novice national championship tournaments, as well as a national title for community colleges. The NDT is one of the most prestigious college tournaments. CSTV a college sports network makes a documentary of the NDTs every year and showcases the top teams and some of the highlights from the tournament. NDT Documentary

See also 

 Debates
 Conversation
 Dialectics
 Public speaking
International high-school debating
 Heart of Europe Debating Tournament
 World Individual Debating and Public Speaking Championships
 World Schools Debating Championships
 National High School Debate League of China
International university debating

 Debate camp#Popular camps/institutes
 Australasian Intervarsity Debating Championships
 American Parliamentary Debate Association
 Canadian University Society for Intercollegiate Debate
 International Public Debate Association
 National Association of Urban Debate Leagues
 North American Debating Championship
 North American Public Speaking Championship
 World Universities Debating Championship
 World Universities Debating Championship in Spanish

External links
High school debate tournaments
The Harvard Debate Tournament
Joy of Tournaments
Tabroom.com
STA-XL Plus Tabulation Software
Debate Results (College Policy)

Debate videos
Dartmouth Debate Workshop
Dartmouth Debate Institute

Competitions, Policy debate
 
Student competitions